ULEB Cup 2007–08 Final Eight was the final round of 2007–08 ULEB Cup, and there were eight teams, which won their matches in Sixteenth Finals and Eighth finals. The Final Eight was held in Turin, Italy, at the Torino Palavela arena. The matches were played from 10 to 13 April.

Accommodation

Arena
The arena, which hosted the Final Eight, is Torino Palavela in Turin. It is used also for figure skating and ice hockey. For basketball the seating capacity of the arena is 9,200.

Competition

Bracket

Results

Quarterfinals

Semifinals

Third Place

Final

Notes

External links
ULEB Cup
Eurobasket.com

Final Eight
2007–08
2007–08 in Italian basketball
2007–08 in Polish basketball
2007–08 in Russian basketball
2007–08 in Spanish basketball
2007–08 in Turkish basketball
International basketball competitions hosted by Italy